The Patterson Viaduct was built by the Baltimore and Ohio Railroad (B&O) as part of its Old Main Line during May to December 1829. The viaduct spanned the Patapsco River at Ilchester, Maryland. It was heavily damaged by a flood in 1868 and subsequently replaced with other structures.

History and design

Original bridge 
The Patterson Viaduct was one of three (along with the Carrollton Viaduct and Oliver Viaduct) constructed for the first phase of the railroad, which ran  between Baltimore and Ellicott's Mills (today's Ellicott City). Similar in construction to the Carrollton Viaduct, the Patterson Viaduct was named for B&O director and well known civic leader and merchant William Patterson, who also donated land for Patterson Park in east Baltimore. It was designed by Caspar Wever and built under the supervision of John McCartney, one of Wever's assistants. McCartney's good work on the Patterson Viaduct was later rewarded with the contract to build the longer curving Thomas Viaduct downstream over the Patapsco at Relay in 1833–1835.

It had four graduated arches: two of  chord length each and two of  chord length each. The two smaller side arches allowed the passage of two county roadways, one on each side of the river. The exterior surfaces of the granite blocks were rusticated.

Patterson ceremonially opened the viaduct on December 4, 1829, a year and a half after construction began on the line, the first in America. In 1830, the viaduct was part of the route used by the B&O's first horse-drawn carriage train to Ellicott's Mills inaugurating railway traffic.

Second bridge 
The viaduct was almost totally destroyed in 1868 by a massive flood that devastated and wiped out numerous stone mills and industrial structures along the river. In 1869, it was replaced by a single-span Bollman truss of cast and wrought iron by Wendel Bollman, reusing the original roadway arch and upstream wing wall of the west abutment.

Third bridge 

Today, all that remains of the original 1829 viaduct is the single arch that spanned the roadway on the west bank and the abutment on the east bank. The ruins were listed on the National Register of Historic Places on June 3, 1976. In 2006, a cable-stayed footbridge carrying the Grist Mill Trail, with a design that echoes the historic architecture and engineering of a Bollman Bridge, was added atop the abutments.

See also
List of Howard County properties in the Maryland Historical Trust
List of bridges documented by the Historic American Engineering Record in Maryland
List of tunnels documented by the Historic American Engineering Record in Maryland
List of bridges on the National Register of Historic Places in Maryland

References

External links

 Maryland Historical Trust, Crownsville, MD.  Accessed 2016-01-22.

Bridges completed in 1829
Crossings of the Patapsco River
Railroad bridges in Maryland
Baltimore and Ohio Railroad bridges
Ruins in the United States
Railroad bridges on the National Register of Historic Places in Maryland
Historic American Engineering Record in Maryland
Viaducts in the United States
Bridges in Baltimore County, Maryland
Bridges in Howard County, Maryland
National Register of Historic Places in Howard County, Maryland
National Register of Historic Places in Baltimore County, Maryland
Stone arch bridges in the United States